Vanhankaupunginselkä (also called Vanhankaupunginlahti) is a bay area which together with parts of adjoining Viikki district constitute a natural conservation zone near downtown Helsinki in the southern part of Finland. The area is listed in Ramsar Convention on Wetlands of International Importance, is part of European Union's Natura 2000 program and is also listed as BirdLife International's Important Bird Area.

Geographically the area lies east of Helsinki peninsula and is surrounded by the districts of Hermanni, Arabianranta, Viikki, Herttoniemi and Kulosaari. The Vantaa River ends at the north end of Vanhankaupunginselkä.

Although the area appears to be either land or water on various maps or satellite pictures, it is largely marsh-like, impassable either on foot or on boat. Most parts of the area are covered with reeds as tall as a person, which will prevent use of boats, while the subsoil beneath the reeds is soft and muddy, thus preventing passage on foot.

However, for the purposes of walking between the reeds the City of Helsinki has constructed some duckboards, which permit the visitors on the area to walk between the reeds. While these duckboards permit the visitors to walk between the reeds, the duckboards are just two to four planks wide, which require the visitors to apply appropriate caution in general and while passing other visitors. During times of higher water, the duckboards can be submerged in whole or in part, while in winter, the boards can be warped or destroyed by ice.

As for the bird species in the area, 285 different species have been observed on the area. Out of these species, 114 have nested on the area during last 10 years.

When the species of area are considered, certain species rare in Finland nest at the area. Examples of these are western marsh harrier, Eurasian bittern, white-backed woodpecker, red-backed shrike, ortolan bunting and black woodpecker.

As for other species, various predators like hawks and owls are frequently observed on the area.

The rules applicable to visitors of Vanhankaupunginselkä are fairly strict. As per the instructions printed on the signs all over the area, visitors on the area are not permitted to move between the reeds while the area is unfrozen, collect or damage the foliage or distribute animals in general. In addition, fishing is not permitted at the area, nor is walking unleashed dogs or horse riding. Furthermore, as Vanhankaupunginselkä is frequently visited by persons interested in nature, informal social control is strict. Littering, loud behavioural and comparable activities are typically strongly condemned.

The visitors can commute to the area either by cars, trams or buses. The trams number 6 and 8 have stops less than a kilometre from the area and various locations near the area offer ample parking space.

Birds at Vanhankaupunginselkä and Viikki Area

References

External links 

Geography of Helsinki
Bays of Finland
Ramsar sites in Finland
Important Bird Areas of Finland
Landforms of Uusimaa